Richard Eugene McGeorge (born September 14, 1948 in Roanoke, Virginia) is a former professional American football player who played tight end for nine seasons for the Green Bay Packers in the National Football League.

Playing career
After graduating from Jefferson High School in Roanoke, Virginia, McGeorge enrolled and played football at Elon College (now Elon University). He was the first tight end selected in the 1970 NFL Draft. Other tight ends who would also go on to play in the NFL who were drafted after McGeorge in 1970 include Raymond Chester, Rich Caster and Stu Voigt. While he did not start in any of the 14 games he played in his rookie season, he would go on to start 101 games for the Packers. He was the Packers' starting tight end in every 1971 game and in all Packers games between 1973 and 1978 but one. He caught 175 passes  for 2,370 yards in his NFL career. McGeorge had also started the first two games in 1972, but was lost for the season to a knee injury in the second regular season game, against the Oakland Raiders. He was therefore unavailable to play for the Packers in their playoff loss against the Washington Redskins--the only time the Packers made the playoffs in McGeorge's years there. McGeorge bounced back the next season, and was named the Packers' offensive player of the year in 1973.

Personal life
McGeorge received his BA degree in Health and Physical Education from Elon in 1971. He and his wife Bonnie have two sons, Randy and Jason.

Post-playing career
McGeorge spent most of his post-NFL career as an assistant football coach and offensive coordinator. He was an assistant coach in three different pro football leagues: the NFL (with the Miami Dolphins), the USFL (with the Tampa Bay Bandits and the XFL, where he was the offensive coordinator for the Memphis Maniax in the XFL's only season, 2001. He worked under Steve Spurrier at both Duke University and the University of Florida, and was his offensive coordinator with the Bandits. In addition, he worked as an assistant coach at North Carolina Central University and Shaw University, until having to leave his post at Shaw due to liver problems. He received a liver transplant in 2012. He was inducted into the College Football Hall of Fame in 2012 for his college football career at Elon University.

References

1948 births
Living people
Sportspeople from Roanoke, Virginia
American football tight ends
Elon Phoenix football players
Green Bay Packers players
Memphis Maniax coaches
Miami Dolphins coaches
College Football Hall of Fame inductees
Liver transplant recipients